The 2007 FIA Alternative Energies Cup is the first season of the FIA Alternative Energies Cup, a world championship for vehicles with alternative energy propulsion organized by the Fédération Internationale de l'Automobile. The season consisted of seven rallies, beginning on April 1, and ended on November 11.

Italy's Giuliano Mazzoni won the Drivers championship, and Toyota secured the Manufacturers' title.

Driver Standings

Manufacturer Standings

References

FIA E-Rally Regularity Cup seasons
Fia Alternative Energies Cup